Jardins (Portuguese for Gardens) is the name given to an upper class region of São Paulo city, which includes the neighbourhoods all comprised within the Subprefecture of Pinheiros:
 Jardim Paulista - in the Jardim Paulista district
 Jardim América - in the Jardim Paulista district
 Jardim Europa - in the Pinheiros district 
 Jardim Paulistano - in the Pinheiros district

Additionally, certain sections of Cerqueira César, located in the south area of Avenida Paulista are also considered as an integral part of the Jardins region.

Jardins is limited by the following roads:  Rebouças Avenue, River Pinheiros Marginal Avenue, Brigadeiro Luís Antônio Avenue and Paulista Avenue. It is considered one of the noblest areas of São Paulo.

Jardins is home to many museums, such as the São Paulo Museum of Image and Sound, the Ema Gordon Klabin Cultural Foundation, the Museum of the Brazilian House and the Brazilian Museum of Sculpture.

Gallery

External links
 Encontra Jardins - Find everything about Jardins

Neighbourhoods in São Paulo
Tourist attractions in São Paulo